Mirzamohammadi-ye Bala (also Romanized as Mīrzāmoḩammadī-ye Bālā; also known as Mīrzāmoḩammadī-ye ‘Olyā) is a village in Sornabad Rural District, Hamaijan District, Sepidan County, Fars Province, Iran. At the 2006 census, its population was 45, in 10 families.

References 

Populated places in Sepidan County